Hristina Risteska (born 21 December 1991 in Prilep) is a Macedonian sprinter who specializes in the 400 metres. She represented Macedonia at the 2012 Summer Olympics.

References 

1991 births
Living people
Macedonian female sprinters
Athletes (track and field) at the 2012 Summer Olympics
Olympic athletes of North Macedonia
Doping cases in athletics
Macedonian sportspeople in doping cases
Sportspeople from Prilep
Olympic female sprinters